The 2016–17 Perth Glory FC season was the club's 20th season since its establishment in 1996. The club participated in the A-League for the 12th time and the FFA Cup for the third time.

Players

Squad information

Squad as of 2 October 2016.

From youth squad

Transfers in

Transfers out

Contract extensions

Technical staff

Statistics

Squad statistics

|-
|colspan="19"|Players no longer at the club:

Pre-season and friendlies

Competitions

Overall

A-League

League table

Results summary

Results by round

Matches

Finals series

FFA Cup

References

External links
 Official Website

Perth Glory
Perth Glory FC seasons